Cheyenne Autumn is a 1964 American epic Western film starring Richard Widmark, Carroll Baker, James Stewart, and Edward G. Robinson. It tells the story of a factual event, the Northern Cheyenne Exodus of 1878–79, told in "Hollywood style" using a great deal of artistic license. The film was the last western directed by John Ford, who proclaimed it an elegy for the Native Americans who had been abused by the U.S. government and misrepresented by many of the director's own films. With a budget of more than $4 million, the film was relatively unsuccessful at the box office and failed to earn a profit for its distributor Warner Bros.

Plot
In 1878, Chiefs Little Wolf and Dull Knife lead over three hundred starved and weary Cheyenne Indians from their reservation in the Oklahoma Territory to their former traditional home in Wyoming. The U.S. government sees this as an act of rebellion, and the sympathetic Captain Thomas Archer of the U.S. Army is forced to lead his troops in an attempt to stop the tribe. As the press misrepresents the natives' motives and goals for their trek as malicious, the U.S. Secretary of the Interior Carl Schurz tries to prevent violence from erupting between the Army and the natives. Also featured are James Stewart as Marshal Wyatt Earp, Dolores del Río as Spanish Woman, and Carroll Baker as a pacifist Quaker school teacher and Archer's love interest.

Opening scene narrated by Richard Widmark
"The beginning of a day. September 7th, 1878. It dawned like any other day on the Cheyenne reservation... in that vast barren land in the American Southwest... which was then called Indian Territory.

But this wasn't just another day to the Cheyenne. Far from their homeland... as out of place in this desert as eagles in a cage... their three great chiefs prayed over the sacred bundle... that at last, the promises made to them... when the white man sent them here more than a year ago... would today be honored. The promises that had led them to give up their own way of life... in their own green and fertile country, 1500 miles to the north."

Cast

 Richard Widmark as Capt. Thomas Archer
 Carroll Baker as Deborah Wright
 Karl Malden as Capt. Henry W. Wessells Jr. [Fort Robinson commander]
 Sal Mineo as Red Shirt
 Dolores del Río as Spanish Woman [Red Shirt's mother]
 Ricardo Montalbán as Little Wolf
 Gilbert Roland as Dull Knife
 Arthur Kennedy as Doc Holliday [in Dodge City]
 Patrick Wayne as Second Lieut. Scott
 Elizabeth Allen as Miss Plantagenet [in Dodge City]
 John Carradine as Jeff Blair [in Dodge City]
 Victor Jory as Tall Tree
 Mike Mazurki as Sr. First Sergeant
 George O'Brien as Major Braden
 Sean McClory as Dr. O'Carberry [Fort Robinson]
 Judson Pratt as Mayor Dog Kelly [in Dodge City]
 Carmen D'Antonio as Pawnee Woman
 Ken Curtis as Joe [cattle drive and in Dodge City]
and James Stewart as Wyatt Earp [in Dodge City]
Edward G. Robinson as the Secretary of the Interior, Carl Schurz

Production

Preproduction
John Ford long wanted to make a movie about the Cheyenne exodus. As early as 1957, he wrote a treatment with his son Patrick Ford, envisioning a small-scale drama with non-professional Indian actors. Early drafts of the script drew on Howard Fast's novel The Last Frontier. However, the film ultimately took its plot and title from Mari Sandoz's Cheyenne Autumn, which Ford preferred due to its focus on the Cheyenne. Elements of Fast's novel remain in the finished film, namely the character of Captain Archer (called Murray in the book), the depiction of Secretary Carl Schurz and the Dodge City, Kansas  scenes.

Reluctantly abandoning the docudrama idea, Ford wanted Anthony Quinn and Richard Boone to play Dull Knife and Little Wolf as well-known actors with some Indian ancestry. He also suggested black actor Woody Strode for a role. The studio insisted on Ford's casting Ricardo Montalbán and Gilbert Roland.

Filming
The film was photographed in Super Panavision 70 by William Clothier, whose work was nominated for an Academy Award. Gilbert Roland earned a Golden Globe Award nomination for Best Supporting Actor.

Editing
The original version was 158 minutes, Ford's longest work. Warner Bros. later decided to edit the "Dodge City" sequence out of the film, reducing the running time to 145 minutes, although it was shown in theaters during the film's initial release. This sequence features James Stewart as Wyatt Earp and Arthur Kennedy as Doc Holliday. Some critics have argued that this comic episode, mostly unrelated to the rest of an otherwise serious movie, breaks the flow of the story. It was later restored for the VHS and subsequent DVD releases.

Locations
Much of the film was shot in Monument Valley Tribal Park on the Arizona-Utah border, where Ford had filmed scenes for many of his earlier films, especially Stagecoach and The Searchers. Parts of the film also were shot at the San Juan River at Mexican Hat, Professor Valley, Castle Valley, the Colorado River, Fisher Canyon, and Arches in Utah. Although the principal tribal leaders were played by Ricardo Montalbán and Gilbert Roland (as well as Dolores del Río and Sal Mineo in major roles), Ford again used numerous members of the Navajo tribe in this production.

Native language issue
Ford used Navajo people to portray the Cheyenne. Dialogue that is supposed to be in the "Cheyenne language" is actually Navajo. This made little difference to white audiences, but for Navajo communities the film became very popular because the Navajo actors were openly using ribald and crude language that had nothing to do with the film. For example, during the scene where the treaty is signed, the chief's solemn speech just pokes fun at the size of the colonel's penis. Some academics now consider this an important moment in the development of Native Americans' identity because they are able to mock Hollywood's historical interpretation of the American West.

Reception
The reviews were mixed. Bosley Crowther, critic for The New York Times, praised it highly, calling it "a beautiful and powerful motion picture that stunningly combines a profound and passionate story of mistreatment of American Indians with some of the most magnificent and energetic cavalry-and-Indian lore ever put upon the screen." He was disappointed, however, that after the humorous (if "superfluous") Dodge City sequence, "the picture does not rise again to its early integrity and authenticity", and the climax is "neither effective and convincing drama nor is it faithful to the novel". The New Yorker'''s Richard Brody cited the "rueful, elegiac grandeur of John Ford's final Western".Variety disagreed, however, calling it "a rambling, episodic account" in which "the original premise of the Mari Sandoz novel is lost sight of in a wholesale insertion of extraneous incidents which bear little or no relation to the subject." The New Republic's Stanley Kauffmann wrote "the acting is bad, the dialogue trite and predictable, the pace funereal, the structure fragmented, the climaxes puny".

The September 1965 issue of MAD satirized it as "Cheyenne Awful."

The film is recognized by American Film Institute in these lists:
 2008: AFI's 10 Top 10:
 Nominated Western Film

Award nominations
 Nominated: Academy Award for Best Cinematography: William H. Clothier
 Nominated: Golden Globe Award for Best Supporting Actor - Motion Picture: Gilbert Roland

Documentary short
Before the release of Cheyenne Autumn, a 19-minute documentary, Cheyenne Autumn Trail, was put into production. Narrated by James Stewart, the short featured clips from the feature, recounting the historical events depicted in the film, depicting memorials to Little Wolf and Dull Knife and presenting life on the reservation in 1964 for descendants of the Cheyenne who participated in the Northern Cheyenne Exodus. Cheyenne Autumn Trail is included as an extra feature on the Cheyenne Autumn'' DVD issued in 2006.

See also

List of American films of 1964

References

External links
 
 
 
 
 

1964 films
1964 Western (genre) films
American Western (genre) films
1960s English-language films
Films about Native Americans
Films based on American novels
Films set in 1878
Films shot in Utah
Films adapted into comics
Warner Bros. films
Films directed by John Ford
Films scored by Alex North
Cultural depictions of Wyatt Earp
Cultural depictions of Doc Holliday
Northern Cheyenne Tribe
Revisionist Western (genre) films
1960s American films
Films shot in Monument Valley